The Minnesota Department of Natural Resources, or Minnesota DNR, is the agency of the U.S. state of Minnesota charged with conserving and managing the state's natural resources. The agency maintains areas such as state parks, state forests, recreational trails, and recreation areas as well as managing minerals, wildlife, and forestry throughout the state. The agency is divided into six divisions - Ecological & Water Resources, Enforcement, Fish & Wildlife, Forestry, Lands & Minerals, and Parks & Trails.

History

Efforts to conserve Minnesota's wildlife began as early as 1876, with a forestry association established to protect the state's timber resources. However, those efforts became futile as the industry took over and people sought the money that could be made on the land. Over time, there were other attempts to control the destruction of resources, but most only had effects on what was done to public land, such as the Land Commission established in 1885. In 1911 the Minnesota Division of Forestry was established to conserve the state's forests by promoting fire prevention and protection.

The first agency created to protect the state's resources was founded in 1931 by the Minnesota Legislature as the Minnesota Department of Conservation.

When the Department of Conservation was created, it brought together four separate state entities: forestry, game and fish, drainage and waters, and lands and timber, while adding a division of state parks and a tourist bureau as well. The Great Depression was an important time for the Department of Conservation. Federal unemployment programs such as the Civilian Conservation Corps and the Works Progress Administration provided labor to construct buildings, clear trails, and plant trees. Many of the buildings in Minnesota's state parks were built during this period.

In 1971 the name of the agency was changed to the Department of Natural Resources to "better reflect its broader responsibilities." More sections of the Minnesota Government were added to the department and many of the division names changed. Old policies were replaced with new and more prevalent ones geared towards issues associated with an increase in state land use.

Divisions

Ecological and Water Resources

The Division of Ecological and Water Resources studies the ecosystems within Minnesota. They analyze the information in order to understand how the ecosystems function, how they benefit the citizens of Minnesota, how they are impacted by human use, and what long-term effects will take place on the health of the ecosystems. The division is involved in locating and protecting endangered and threatened species, as well as the habitats that are vital to the conservation of those species. Another part of the division's responsibilities is in managing threats against the ecosystem. These threats include: harmful invasive species, fish and wildlife diseases, and the negative impact human development can have on the environment. One of the largest programs that the Division of Ecological Resources is in charge of is Minnesota's Nongame Wildlife Program, which focuses on the conservation of species that are not hunted. This would include trumpeter swans, bald eagles and Minnesota's state bird, the common loon. The division is also accountable for all lakes, rivers and streams, wetlands, and ground waters within the state. The division enforces permits implemented to protect and preserve Minnesota's water resources. The program works on observing the effects of climate on the water resources and analyzes the data in order to understand and address the impact the climate has on the Minnesota's wildlife and its citizens.

Enforcement
As the name implies, the division focuses on the enforcement of Minnesota's natural resource laws. Originally part of the Fish and Game Division, the Enforcement Division's goal has not changed much: keep the public safe. Conservation Officers employed by this division enforce laws regarding hunting, fishing, trapping, recreational vehicles, State Parks and wild rice harvesting. A second focus is educating the public about safety. Classes are taught by trained volunteers and are often related to the enforced laws. The division also enforces air and water quality laws.

Fish and Wildlife
The Division of Fish and Wildlife was part of the original Department of Conservation. Originally called the Fish and Game Division, it was created to manage, protect and regulate the state's fish and wildlife resource. They also disperse licenses and recreational vehicle registrations throughout Minnesota.

Forestry

The Division of Forestry was founded in 1911 as the Minnesota Forest Service, predating the Department of Natural Resources and its predecessor Department of Conservation. The mission of the Division of Forestry is to maintain healthy forests. This is done through cooperative forest management, fire management, and state land management. Cooperative management with private land owners vary and are carried out by the Forest Stewardship Program.

Woodland Stewardship Plans

Parks and Trails

The Parks and Trails Division was part of the Minnesota Forestry Service until it was given its own division in the Department of Conservation in 1935. The Division of Parks and Trails has three major goals. The first being to preserve both natural and cultural resources in Minnesota. The second comes in educating visitors. The third goal is to support opportunities for visitors to enjoy recreational activities in the parks, without causing damage to the wildlife, so people will be able to appreciate the resources for generations. The division takes part in publishing individual water access maps by county, individual state trail maps, snowmobile trail maps, off-highway vehicle trail maps, Lake Superior kayak trail maps as well as maps of rivers within Minnesota for boaters and canoeists.

The Parks and Trails Division manages 76 state park and recreation areas, 56 primitive campgrounds within Minnesota State Forests, 35 designated state water trails (totalling over 4,500 miles), over 3,000 public water accesses, over 1,300 miles of state trails (600 miles of paved trails), and over 300 fishing piers throughout the state. Itasca State Park is the second-oldest state park in the U.S., established in 1891 and contains the headwaters of the Mississippi River. The largest state park in size is the 33,895 acre (13,717 ha) Saint Croix State Park.

Lawsuit
On November 27, 2012, the White Bear Lake Restoration Association filed a lawsuit against the Minnesota DNR for what the group alleges is the agency's role in the city's disappearing lake. This resulted in the DNR getting 13 communities to adopt water conservation tactics to reduce water consumption.

Publications
The Minnesota Department of Natural Resources publishes a magazine called the Minnesota Conservation Volunteer. It is distributed bimonthly, mailed to subscribers the first weeks of January, March, May, July, September, and November. Minnesota Conservation Volunteer is a "donor-supported magazine advocating conservation and careful use of Minnesota's natural resources." Most of the articles are also made available on the official DNR website.

Volunteering
Many of the services provided by the Minnesota DNR are actually done by the more than 33,000 volunteers that actively contribute. The department has volunteer positions ranging from jobs that require little to no prior experience, to jobs that require specialists with varying skills and a great amount of experience. There are over a dozen specific volunteer programs offered through the DNR that aim to preserve the state's natural beauty.

Education and outreach
The DNR offers a variety of educational resources including curriculum supplements (Project Learning Tree, Project WET, Project WILD, MinnAqua), outdoor skills and safety training, education materials (field guides, learning kits), volunteer training (Master Naturalist, hunter education), and a variety of other resources (DNR for kids, grants). For a comprehensive list visit http://www.dnr.state.mn.us/education/index.html.

Commissioners
Commissioners of the DNR since its formation in 1931:

William T. Cox August 20, 1931 - February 1933
E.V. Willard (acting) February 1933 - September 1933
E.V. Willard September 1933 - July 1937
Herman C. Wenzel July 1, 1937 – April 26, 1939
Lester R. Badger (acting) April 26, 1939 - July 1939
Lewis H. Merrill (acting) July 14, 1939 – 1939
William L. Strunk February 1, 1940 - February 1, 1943
E.V. Willard February 1, 1943 - March 16, 1943
Chester S. Wilson March 16, 1943 – March 15, 1955
Clarence Prout (acting) March 15, 1955 – May 1, 1955
George A. Selke May 1, 1955 – 1960
Clarence Prout January 4, 1961 - July 1, 1963
Wayne H. Olson July 1, 1963 – July 16, 1966
Robert L. Herbst (acting) July 16, 1966 - February 14, 1967
Jarle B. Leirfallom January 20, 1967 - January 1971
Robert L. Herbst January 4, 1971 - February 16, 1977
Michael C. O'Donnell (acting) February 1977 - June 30, 1977
William B. Nye July 5, 1977 – June 30, 1978
Joseph N. Alexander July 1, 1978 - January 4, 1991
Rodney W. Sando January 3, 1991 - January 4, 1999
Ronald Nargang (acting) January 4, 1999 - January 13, 1999
Alan Horner January 13, 1999 - January 19, 1999
Raymond B. Hitchcock (acting) January 20, 1999 - February 14, 1999
Allen Garber February 15, 1999 - January 3, 2003
Brad Moore (acting) January 6, 2003 - January 20, 2003
Eugene R. Merriam January 27, 2003 - January 2, 2007
Mark Holsten January 3, 2007 – January 3, 2011
Laurie Martinson (acting) January 4, 2011 - January 5, 2011
Tom Landwehr January 6, 2011 - January 5, 2019
Dave Schad  January 5, 2019 - January 7, 2019 
Sarah Strommen January 7, 2019 – present

See also
List of Minnesota state parks
List of Minnesota state forests
List of state and territorial fish and wildlife management agencies in the United States
Natural history of Minnesota
Geology of Minnesota
List of ecoregions in Minnesota
List of lakes of Minnesota
List of rivers of Minnesota

External links
Minnesota Department of Natural Resources - Official Site
Minnesota State Parks & Recreation Areas
Minnesota State Forests
Minnesota State Trails
Minnesota State Wildlife Management Areas

References

State agencies of Minnesota
State environmental protection agencies of the United States
State forestry agencies in the United States
1931 establishments in Minnesota
Natural resources agencies in the United States
Government agencies established in 1931